Carlton Williams Bongo Juma (15 November 1979 – 29 November 2003), better known by his stage name K-Rupt, was a Kenyan rapper who had national success in the two years leading up to his murder in 2003. He collaborated with artists such as Fizzle Dogg, Bigpin, and E-Sir, who died earlier the same year. He also did concerts with fellow hip hop musician Nameless and was signed to the record label Ogopa Deejays.

K-Rupt's hit singles in Kenya included “Changamshwa,” “Tukawake,” and “Chacha.” His single “Dada Njoo” was on the charts at the time of his death. The song “Bamba” with fellow rappers the late E-Sir and Bigpin became a hit. It had been recorded before his stint as a stand-by presenter at Nation FM.

Death
K-Rupt was killed by a single gunshot wound in a matatu headed to a concert. Witnesses said K-Rupt, aged 24, argued with the gangsters, who immediately opened fire on him, killing him with a single bullet. They dumped his body in Laikipia Forest according to police reports.

References

External links 
 K-rupt profile at True Blaq Entertainment

Kenyan musicians
Kenyan rappers
1979 births
2003 deaths
Kenyan murder victims
People murdered in Kenya
Deaths by firearm in Kenya